Orectochilus orbisonorum is a species of whirligig beetle named in honor of Roy and Barbara Orbison. It's black on top and translucent white on the bottom. Its length is about 5 millimeters. It lives in India.

See also
List of organisms named after famous people (born 1900–1949)
List of organisms named after famous people (born 1950–present)

References
Original scientific paper

Gyrinidae
Roy Orbison
Beetles described in 2008